The 2022–23 Pacific Tigers men's basketball team represented the University of the Pacific during the 2022–23 NCAA Division I men's basketball season. The Tigers are led by second-year head coach Leonard Perry and played their home games at the Alex G. Spanos Center in Stockton, California as members of the West Coast Conference.

Previous season 
The Tigers finished the 2021–22 season 8–22, 3–11 in WCC play to finish in eighth place. They lost in the first round of the WCC tournament to Loyola Marymount.

Offseason

Departures

Incoming transfers

2022 recruiting class

Roster

Schedule and results

|-
!colspan=9 style=| Non-conference regular season

|-
!colspan=9 style=| WCC regular season

|-
!colspan=9 style=| WCC tournament

Source:

References

Pacific Tigers men's basketball seasons
Pacific
Pacific
Pacific